In the 28th a season in which four Western zone teams had better records than any Eastern zone team, Santiago de Cuba, from the east, won its second title.

Standings

Western zone

Eastern zone

Playoffs

References

 (Note - text is printed in a white font on a white background, depending on browser used.)

Cuban National Series seasons
Cuban National Series
Base
Base